James Alexander McLean Roy  (3 March 1893 – 26 May 1971) was a New Zealand politician of the National Party.

Biography

He was born and educated in Wairuna near Clinton. He farmed on his father's farm in Wairuna, and his own farm in Cave, South Canterbury. In World War I he was a lieutenant and was awarded the Military Cross and bar, and his medals are on display at the National Army Museum in Waiouru. His second citation, for actions on 9 November 1918, reads:

He was a member of the Clinton Presbyterian Church, and Superintendent of the Sunday School there.

In 1936, he joined the new National Party formed from a coalition of the Reform Party and the United Party plus three Independents (Roy, with James Hargest and William Polson). He held the Clutha electorate until 1960, when he retired.

Roy died in 1971.

Notes

References

1893 births
1971 deaths
Independent MPs of New Zealand
New Zealand National Party MPs
New Zealand Presbyterians
New Zealand military personnel of World War I
New Zealand recipients of the Military Cross
New Zealand people of Scottish descent
Members of the New Zealand House of Representatives
New Zealand MPs for South Island electorates
20th-century New Zealand politicians